The Fissenkenkopf is a hill in the Harz Mountains of Germany, that rises south of Sieber in the district of Göttingen in Lower Saxony. It is 527 metres high and is the western extension of the  Adlersberg and the Kloppstert hills.

Sources 
 Topographic map 1:25,000 series, No. 4328 Bad Lauterberg im Harz

Hills of the Harz
Mountains of Lower Saxony
Osterode am Harz